Babu Nath Singh  was an Indian politician. He was elected to the Lok Sabha, the lower house of the Parliament of India from the Surguja constituency of Madhya Pradesh in 1952, 1957, 1962, 1967 and 1971 as a member of the Indian National Congress.

References

External links
 Official biographical sketch in Parliament of India website

Indian National Congress politicians
Lok Sabha members from Madhya Pradesh
India MPs 1952–1957
India MPs 1957–1962
India MPs 1962–1967
India MPs 1967–1970
India MPs 1971–1977
Year of birth missing
Year of death missing
Place of birth missing
Chhattisgarh politicians
People from Surguja district
Indian National Congress politicians from Madhya Pradesh